Quilmaná District is one of sixteen districts of Cañete Province in Peru.

Location
Quilmana is located adjacent to Imperial District, Nuevo Imperial District, and lunahuana District. To the north with Asia District. And to the west to San Vicente de Cañete District.

Economy
Most of quilmana's workforce dedicates to agriculture, for example many crop citrus such as oranges, clementines, lemons, tangerines, as well as apples and strawberries.

There are a few cotton factories.

References